Emory Brace Remington (1892–1971) was a trombonist and music teacher.  His unique method made him one of the most well-known and influential trombone educators in history. He was a member of the Rochester Philharmonic Orchestra from 1923 to 1949, and on the faculty of the Eastman School of Music in Rochester, NY from 1922 until his death in 1971.

Early life
Born in Rochester, New York on December 22, 1892, Emory Remington began his musical studies in the Boys' Choir of an Episcopal Church.  His Father, Fred Remington, a brass instructor who played cornet and trumpet, presented young Emory with a trombone at the age of 14.  By the age of 17 he was a member (and regular soloist) with the Rochester Park Band.

As a young trombonist, Remington studied with Garell Simons, Principal Trombonist of the Philadelphia Orchestra. 

In 1917 Remington joined the United States Navy and was assigned to the orchestra at a training station near Chicago.  One of his bunkmates in the Navy orchestra was comedian/violinist Jack Benny whom he spoke of with admiration.

Professional career
Upon returning from the Navy, Remington joined the Eastman Theater Orchestra in Rochester, also becoming a faculty member at the Eastman School of Music in 1922. His performing career was marked by lengthy tenure as Principal Trombonist with both the Rochester Philharmonic and the Eastman-Rochester Orchestra, an amalgamation of the Philharmonic and the Eastman School of Music. He would remain on faculty there for the rest of his life. As a trombone teacher, he was affectionately known to his students as "The Chief". He developed a system of legato warm-up exercises (now immortalized by Donald Hunsberger in his book, The Remington Warm-Up Studies) which have had major influences on trombone practicing up to the present time.

Remington was fond of singing, and during his lessons, he would sing along with the student's trombone sound. He also encouraged his students to look for music to play that was outside of the common literature for trombone, especially music that would improve the singing characteristics of their trombone playing. His emphasis, whether in warm-up or in practice, was on relaxation and playing in a "conversational" and "singing" manner. This was quite different from the more traditional trombone methods of the time which focused on more marcato and regimented technical studies such as the Arban Method.

Another of Remington's contributions was the Eastman Trombone Choir formed in 1941. A large ensemble of trombonists would gather to play music written for multiple trombones or transcribed from other sources, such as the chorales and fugues of Johann Sebastian Bach. Separating the different musical parts (i.e. SATB: soprano, alto, tenor, bass) into sections of trombonists, and transposing the music into the proper registers for the trombone. Remington encouraged his students to transcribe music for this ensemble, amassing a large library of "new" works for it. The music of J. S. Bach became the backbone of the ensemble. Remington used this great music as a tool to train his students in the art of ensemble performance. Ralph Sauer has made a fine reputation with his beautiful transcriptions of the music of Bach. Donald Hunsberger's transcription of Bach's Passacaglia and Fugue is considered one of the first of the great Bach transcriptions for trombone choir.

Selected sections from his method include exercises designed around sustained long tones, security in the high register, legato tonguing, flexibility or "lip-slurs", and "pattern scales" (which would create a trombonist equally adept in all the keys).

In 1954, Remington completed work in conjunction with C.G. Conn Ltd. in developing the C.G. Conn 88H tenor trombone. The unique tone color and dynamic range of the instrument have made it popular amongst trombonists and contributed to its continuous production from its debut in 1954 to the present. Conn also manufactured a "Remington" tenor trombone mouthpiece which was available in either silver or gold plate. Remington encouraged his first-year students to switch to this mouthpiece, as it produced a beautiful clear sound with moderate effort. The effect of the 88H combined with the Remington mouthpiece produced a very uniform sound in the Trombone Choir and trombone sections in the large ensembles. As students progressed, they would be encouraged to switch to other mouthpieces to refine their sounds depending on performance conditions.

Remington taught at the Eastman School for 49 years, teaching countless students, some of whom rank among the finest trombonists in history. He died on December 10, 1971. On October 20, 1979, Room 310 at the Eastman School of Music was formally named the Emory B. Remington Rehearsal Room.

Remington (band) was named after Remington's son, David Remington (1926-2007). His daughter, Janet Remington was Principal Harpist with the Pittsburgh Symphony Orchestra for many years.

Personal life
Remington was married to Laura W. (née Wilbur) Remington (1891-1966) a professional organist and pianist. Together, they had three children, David, Emory Jr., and Janet.

David (1926-2007), the eldest, was a jazz trombonist, had his own big band in Chicago, toured, and made some recordings. Emory Jr. worked for Eastman Kodak. Janet was a world-class harpist, having studied with Eileen Malone. She became the Principal Harpist with the Pittsburgh Symphony under William Steinberg.

A Partial List of Emory Remington's Students and their Principal Career Positions (in alphabetical order)

Trombonists who studied with Emory Remington at the Eastman School of Music:
Early Anderson - Jazz artist; New York City Broadway productions and recordings
Edwin Anderson - Cleveland Orchestra, Indiana University
Herbert (Sonny) Ausman - Los Angeles Philharmonic, recording engineer
Ed Bahr - Delta State University, Erie Philharmonic, Montgomery Symphony (AL), and the Great Lakes Chamber Orchestra (MI)
Charles Baker - New Jersey Symphony Orchestra
James Bates - U.S. Army Band arranger, National Gallery Orchestra, L.A. freelance arranger, AMTRAK troubleshooter
Thomas Beversdorf - Indiana University, Saddler Well Ballet, Pittsburgh Symphony, Houston Symphony, Rochester Philharmonic.
Roger Bobo - Rochester Philharmonic, Royal Concertgebouw, Los Angeles Philharmonic (Bobo studied briefly with Remington at Eastman)
Alan Bomwell - District Manager (retired) Conn-Selmer, New York music teacher
Fred Boyd - Syracuse Symphony Orchestra, South Carolina Philharmonic, Chautauqua Symphony (Bass Trombone & Tuba), Private Low Brass Teacher
Robert Boyd (BM '43) - Cleveland Orchestra
Robert Brawn - 
Ken Bruce - 
Douglas Burden (BM '75) - National Arts Centre Orchestra, McGill University, University of Ottawa, Queen's University, Capital BrassWorks
Larry Campbell - United States Coast Guard Band (Ret.) and Louisiana State University (Ret.)
Gordon Cherry (BM '71) - Vancouver Symphony Orchestra, CBC Radio Orchestra, University of British Columbia, National Arts Center Orchestra, Cherry Classics Music publishing
M. Dale Clark - Rochester Philharmonic, followed Remington at Principal Trombone, later with Xerox
Doug Courtright - Syracuse Symphony Orchestra
Gregory Cox (BM '71) - Vancouver Symphony Orchestra, CBC Radio Orchestra, North Carolina Symphony, Eastern Music Festival
Terry Cravens - University of Southern California
Paul Crawford - New Orleans jazz musician
Chuck Dalkert - Taught at the University of Wisconsin, University of Western Ontario and Ithaca College
Jim Daniels - New York and Pocono Mountains freelance bass trombonist
Tony Dechario - Rochester Philharmonic
Bill Dengler - Rochester freelance, recording engineer
James DeSano - Cleveland Orchestra, Oberlin Conservatory, Syracuse Symphony
Tom Eadie - Victoria Symphony, University of Western Ontario, Up With People
Edward Erwin - New York Philharmonic, retired
Thomas G. Everett - Taught at Harvard, New England Conservatory, Brown University, International Trombone Workshop, Indiana University Summer School, freelance with the Boston Symphony, Boston Pops, Boston Ballet
Bob Fanning - U.S. Coast Guard Band
David Fetter - Baltimore Symphony, Cleveland Orchestra, Peabody Conservatory
Reginald Fink - Oklahoma City Symphony, Assistant Professor West Virginia University, Ithaca College, Ohio University
Dr. Richard Fote - Crane School of Music of SUNY Potsdam, State College Fredonia New York, Erie Philharmonic. PA
Bob Gillespie - New Orleans Symphony, Oklahoma City Symphony, Metropolitan Opera Orchestra, Goldman Band, National Symphony Orchestra of the South African Broadcasting Corporation (1974-2000), West Point Band
Dennis Good - Nashville Symphony Orchestra
Gary Good - Music administration
Robert Gray (MM '50, DMA '57) - University of Illinois
Gary Greenhoe - Milwaukee Symphony Orchestra, North Carolina Symphony manufacturer: Greenhoe trombones
Paul Gregory - 
Lewis Van Haney - New York Philharmonic, Indiana University
Wesley Hanson - Ball State University
Bill Harris - Syracuse Symphony
David Hart - North Carolina Symphony
Charles (Chick) Herman - Principal Trombone Atlanta Wind Symphony, taught public school music
Nelson Hinds -
Dr. Neill Humfeld - East Texas State University
Dr. Donald Hunsberger - Eastman Wind Ensemble Music Director
Hal Janks - Metropolitan Opera Orchestra
Robert Jones - Rochester Philharmonic, followed M. Dale Clark
Bob Kalwas - Public school music teacher, freelance Rochester New York
David Kanter - Symphony of the Potomac
Simon Karasick (BM '33) - Manhattan School of Music, NYC freelance
Jeremy Kempton - Band Director at North Shore High School NJ, Music Director of the Island Chamber Symphony, Brooklyn Symphony Orchestra, Massapequa Philharmonic
Don King - Kennedy Center Opera House Orchestra, National Ballet Orchestra
Dale Kirkland - Freelance artist, Buddy Rich band
William Peter Kline - Teaches music theory, music appreciation, low brass, and directs the brass ensemble at San Antonio College
Donald Knaub - Rochester Philharmonic, Eastman School of Music faculty, Professor of Trombone at the University of Texas at Austin
Kenneth Knowles - Memorial University Newfoundland Canada
Stephen Kohlbacher - San Francisco Bay Area Freelance tenor trombonist
Joseph Lalumia - Director of Orchestras, Bridgewater-Raritan High School, New Jersey (1980-2015) retired.
Bob Leech - 
Lance Lehmberg - Freelance Rochester New York
Lester Lehr - 
Dick Lieb - New York recording artist, composer
Art Linsner - Chicago Freelance bass trombonist
Harry Lockwood - 
Ernest Lyon (MA '38) - University of Louisville
Robert Marsteller - Los Angeles Philharmonic, U. of Southern California
Jim Martin - North Carolina Symphony
Patrick McCarty - Composer, arranger
William McCauley - Composer, conductor, arranger, Director Seneca College, North York Symphony Orchestra conductor
Byron McCulloh (BM '49, MM '51) - Pittsburgh Symphony
John McMurray - 
Dominick (Meco) Monardo - NYC freelance Broadway artist, pop music arranger
Donald Miller - Buffalo Philharmonic, founder of Ensemble Music
Robert E. Moran - United States Navy Dance Band, Monroe County (NY) Parks Band, Union Musician, RCSD Music Teacher
Audrey Morrison - soloist, freelance artist
Richard Myers - Buffalo Philharmonic, arranger
Mark Narins - San Francisco area conductor and composer
George Osborn - Rochester Philharmonic, faculty Eastman School of Music
Allen Ostrander - bass trombone: National Symphony, NBC Orchestra, Pittsburgh Symphony, New York Philharmonic
Alvin Parris - Minister and Gospel Choir Director, Rochester NY
Porter Poindexter - New York freelance artist, Broadway performer, recording artist
Raymond Premru - Philharmonia Orchestra (London), Oberlin Conservatory, Philip Jones Brass Ensemble
Bernard O. (Bernie) Pressler - Ball State University
James E. Pugh - New York recording artist, University of Illinois
Gordon Pulis (BM '35) - New York Philharmonic, Philadelphia Orchestra, Toronto Symphony, Metropolitan Opera Orchestra
J. Richard Raum - Regina Symphony Orchestra, University of Regina
Bill Reichenbach Jr. - Los Angeles studio trombonist, soloist, arranger, composer
Dave Richey - Rochester Philharmonic
Janice Robinson - NYC recording and freelance performer,educator,composer and consultant in jazz,popular,modern and classics
Jim Robinson - Choral conductor, SF Bay Area. UNLV Community Band
Henry Romersa - formerly Peabody College, founder of the International Trombone Workshop (now Festival)
Dr. William Runyan - musicologist, conductor, and low brass teacher in Colorado
John Russo - Jazz Artist, North Carolina Symphony Bass Trombone
Bob Saine - Recording engineer
Dr. Russ Schultz - Memphis Symphony Orchestra, Central Washington University, Dean of Fine arts at Lamar University
Ralph Sauer - Los Angeles Philharmonic, Toronto Symphony
Howard Scheib - California Army National Guard 59th Army Band, U. S. Army Reserve 91st Division Band (retired)
Jim Shake - 
Merrill Sherburn - Professor of Trombone, Michigan State University, Lansing Symphony
Stanley Shumway - Arranger
Ron Stanton - Adjunct Professor of Brass at Long Island University, Freelance New York City Bass Trombone artist, Public High School Band program 
Rick Starnes - Conductor, Birmingham Community Concert Band
Harold Steiman - Pittsburgh Symphony
David Stout - Freelance Los Angeles artist, toured with Clyde McCoy
Pete Vivona - Northern Arizona University
Dr. Irvin Wagner - Oklahoma City Philharmonic, University of Oklahoma
Norm Wilcox - arranger and Principal Trombonist of the Finger Lakes Orchestra, Elmira Orchestra
Elwood Williams - San Francisco Ballet, Williams Music Publishing
Jim Willis - Author, Professor of Low Brass at Daytona Beach College
Anne Witherell - Private Trombone Teacher, Stanford University
John Witmer - Freelance western New York trombonist. Taught all levels of instrumental music in public schools and adjunct Professor at Niagara County Community College
Robert Wrasman - 2nd Trombonist Rochester Philharmonic Orchestra 1950's
Ray Wright (BM '43) - Glenn Miller Orchestra, Co-director Radio City Music Hall, Professor of Jazz Studies at Eastman School of Music
Larry Yagodzinski - 
Dorothy Ziegler - National Symphony Orchestra, St. Louis Symphony, Indiana University

References

Sources
The Remington Warm-Up Studies, prepared and edited by Donald Hunsberger
Douglas Yeo's website has some quotes about Remington:
The International Trombone Association has a small history and award in his name:
 Biography at Eastman School of Music

1892 births
1971 deaths
American classical trombonists
Male trombonists
Musicians from Rochester, New York
20th-century American musicians
20th-century classical musicians
20th-century classical trombonists
Classical musicians from New York (state)
20th-century American male musicians